Ernst Haberbier (5 October 1813 – 12 March 1869) was a German composer, pianist and music teacher.

Biography

Ernst Haberbier was born in 1813 in Königsberg. He studied the piano with his father who was an organist. When he was nineteen he left Königsberg and moved to Saint Petersburg. There he became famous as a concert pianist and as a teacher. He became the Imperial Court Pianist in 1847. Around 1850 he moved to Christiania to work on his technique. He gave concerts around Europe until 1866. Then he moved to Bergen and became a teacher. He died 1869 while he was playing a concert. As a composer, Haberbier was best known for his piano music. Two sets of pieces called Études-Poésies (Op 53 and Op 59) were very popular. They are still sometimes played today.

References

Baker's Biographical Dictionary of Music and Musicians (1900) p 242

External links
 

1813 births
1869 deaths
19th-century classical composers
19th-century classical pianists
19th-century German composers
19th-century German male musicians
German classical pianists
German male classical composers
German male pianists
German music educators
German Romantic composers
Male classical pianists